Řežabinec a Řežabinecké tůně (Řežabinec and Ponds of Řežabinec) is a national nature reserve in Kestřany in Písek District in the Czech Republic. It is situated among the villages of Lhota u Kestřan, Ražice and Putim. The area is protected due to the presence of valuable  littoral ecosystems. This environment provides habitat suitable for many species of birds, who use this area for breeding, and other animal species. The protected area includes Řežabinecké pond itself, along with adjacent pools caused by the flooding of old medieval mining holes, and a significant archaeological site on neighboring Pikárna hill, where there was extensive human settlement in the Paleolithic and Mesolithic.

The pond was constructed in a former river bed of the Otava River, and a wetland developed. The construction started in 1530 at the instigation of the Lord of Zvíkov Castle, Kryštof of Švamberk. Gradually the water area became overgrown with littoral vegetation consisting mainly of reeds, and this valuable vegetation covered approximately 40% of the Řežabinec area. However excessive fish production, mostly in the 1970s and 1980s, resulted in damage to the protected area and extinction of many species. Nowadays reed coverage has declined to approximately 15% of the Řežabinec pond area. As of 2011, the pond is state-owned and managed by Nature Conservation Agency of the Czech Republic, which seeks to restore species diversity and minimize negative human impact.

Climate
The nature reservation is one of the warmest places in the southwest of the Czech Republic. The climate here is classified as Cfb by the Köppen-Geiger system. Number of degree heating days is 3454 and annual horizontal solar irradiation is 3090 Wh/m2/day.

References

National nature reserves in the Czech Republic
Protected areas in Písek District